Rafael 'Rafa' Antonio Ponzo García (born 18 October 1978) is a Venezuelan footballer who plays as a goalkeeper.

Club career
Born in Caracas, Ponzo left his country at the age of 20 and moved to Spain, where he played for the vast majority of his career, albeit almost exclusively in the lower leagues. His first stop was at Club Siero in the fourth division, and he went on to represent, also in that tier, CD Tenerife's reserves and Real Oviedo, achieving promotion to the third level with the latter in 2005.

With his next team, Girona FC, Ponzo achieved two consecutive promotions, making his Segunda División debut on 30 August 2008 in a 1–0 away win against RC Celta de Vigo and appearing in 37 matches during the season to help the Catalans retain their league status after ranking 16th (44 goals conceded – three of those in a 0–3 loss at Hércules CF in the late stages in which he was held responsible for the outcome by his own manager Raül Agné). He started 2009–10 back in division three with AD Ceuta, but moved after a few months to Cyprus, where he played for two clubs in quick succession before returning to his homeland and join Mineros de Guayana.

On 7 July 2011, Ponzo signed with another side in the Spanish third division and Asturias, Marino de Luanco. After two years back in his country with Aragua FC, he moved to C.D. Universidad de El Salvador.

38-year-old Ponzo returned to Venezuela in the middle of 2017, signing with Segunda División's Angostura FC.

International career
Ponzo made two appearances for the Venezuela national team.

References

External links

1978 births
Living people
Footballers from Caracas
Venezuelan footballers
Association football goalkeepers
A.C.C.D. Mineros de Guayana players
Aragua FC players
Segunda División players
Segunda División B players
Tercera División players
CD Tenerife B players
Real Oviedo players
Girona FC players
AD Ceuta footballers
Marino de Luanco footballers
Cypriot First Division players
Nea Salamis Famagusta FC players
Ermis Aradippou FC players
Venezuela international footballers
Venezuelan expatriate footballers
Expatriate footballers in Spain
Expatriate footballers in Cyprus
Expatriate footballers in El Salvador
Venezuelan expatriate sportspeople in Spain
Venezuelan expatriate sportspeople in Cyprus
Venezuelan expatriate sportspeople in El Salvador